Laguna Parrillar National Reserve is a national reserve of southern Chile's Magallanes and Antártica Chilena Region.

References

External links

National reserves of Chile
Protected areas established in 1977
Protected areas of Magallanes Region
1977 establishments in Chile